Raer Theaker (born 30 April 1997) is a Welsh retired artistic gymnast, who competed at the 2014 Commonwealth Games in Glasgow, Scotland.

Theaker was born in Cardiff, and became Welsh Champion in March 2014.  She was a member of the team that won the bronze medal in the Women's artistic team all-around competition.

Raer was crowned 2015 Welsh National Champion.

References 

1997 births
Welsh female artistic gymnasts
Living people
Sportspeople from Cardiff
Commonwealth Games bronze medallists for Wales
Gymnasts at the 2014 Commonwealth Games
Commonwealth Games medallists in gymnastics
Medallists at the 2014 Commonwealth Games